Dave Marshall (born 24 May 1972) is a Barbadian cricketer. He played in 27 first-class and 6 List A matches for the Barbados cricket team from 1992 to 2001.

See also
 List of Barbadian representative cricketers

References

External links
 

1972 births
Living people
Barbadian cricketers
Barbados cricketers
People from Saint Michael, Barbados